Boelson Cottage is a Dutch and Swedish-style colonial era cottage located in Fairmount Park, Philadelphia. The -story gambrel-roofed fieldstone cottage was built sometime between 1678 and 1684. Boelson's cottage is the oldest extant structure in Fairmount Park.

The name of the cottage varied over the years, including Pig's Eye, Tom Moore's, Aunt Cornelia's, and Belmont Cottage—the latter due to its proximity to Belmont Mansion and its possible use as housing for servants of that mansion. The name is also sometimes spelled, or misspelled, Boelsen.

A wooden shed was attached to the south wall of the cottage around 1950. A group called the Friends of the Philadelphia Parks renovated the cottage in 1989–90 and then used it as their office. The original floor, windows, and doors were replaced, as was most of the original woodwork and ironwork.

The cottage is registered on the Philadelphia Register of Historic Places and is an inventoried structure within the Fairmount Park Historic District entry on the National Register of Historic Places.

See also

 List of houses in Fairmount Park
 List of the oldest buildings in Pennsylvania
 National Register of Historic Places listings in West Philadelphia - an inventoried structure within the Fairmount Park listing

References

External links 

Houses in Fairmount Park
Philadelphia Register of Historic Places
West Fairmount Park
Houses on the National Register of Historic Places in Philadelphia
Historic American Buildings Survey in Philadelphia
Dutch Colonial Revival architecture in the United States